Paul Marie Louis Frentrop (born 18 March 1954) is a Dutch politician, professor and journalist who has been a member of the Senate for the Forum for Democracy (FvD) party from 2019 to 2022.

Biography
Frentrop studied psychology and business administration, obtaining a PhD in the latter in 2002. Until 1992, he worked as a financial editor for Het Financieele Dagblad and later NRC Handelsblad. He has also worked as a columnist in other media, such as De Groene Amsterdammer. From 2011 to 2014, he was a professor of corporate governance and capital markets at Nyenrode Business University.

Political career
Frentrop has been a member of the Senate since 2019. In 2020 he wrote the book The havoc of ten years of Rutte with party leader Thierry Baudet. On December 31, 2020, it was announced that he is the first list successor in the House of Representatives to take the vacant seat of Theo Hiddema. He also previously served as interim chairman of the FvD in March 2017 while Baudet was being sworn in as a Member of Parliament.

In 2020, he became the FvD's leader and spokesman in the Senate succeeding Paul Cliteur. In March 2022, he defected from the FvD alongside Theo Hiddema in response to the FvD refusing to attend Volodymyr Zelenskyy's address to the House of Representatives.

Electoral history

References

1954 births
21st-century Dutch politicians
Living people
Members of the Senate (Netherlands)
Forum for Democracy (Netherlands) politicians
Dutch writers
Dutch educators
Dutch journalists
Politicians from The Hague